Kaufman or Kauffman may refer to:

People
Kaufmann (surname) Includes Kaufman, Kauffman, Kauffmann

Places
 Kaufman, Illinois, an unincorporated community in Madison Count
 Kaufman, Texas, a city in Kaufman County
 Kaufman County, Texas, located in the northeast area of the state
 Kauffman Stadium, a baseball stadium in Kansas City, Missouri
 Kauffman's Distillery Covered Bridge, in Lancaster County, Pennsylvania
 Mount Kauffman, a mountain in Antarctica

Other
 Kaufmann's, a former department store chain

See also 
 Ewing Marion Kauffman Foundation a nonprofit known as the Kauffman Foundation
 Kauffman Fellows Program, established by the Kauffman Foundation